The Silent Duel may refer to:

 The Quiet Duel, a 1949 Japanese film, also released as The Silent Duel
 The Silent Duel (1967 film), an Albanian psychological thriller film